Shoromskaya is a rural locality (a village) in Dvinskoye Rural Settlement of Verkhnetoyemsky District, Arkhangelsk Oblast, Russia. The population was 17 as of 2010.

Geography 
Shoromskaya is located 15 km south of Verkhnyaya Toyma (the district's administrative centre) by road. Kharitonovskaya is the nearest rural locality.

References 

Rural localities in Verkhnetoyemsky District